Palace House is the home of the National Horse Racing Museum in the remaining part of Charles II's racing palace in Newmarket, Suffolk, England. It is home to the National Horse Racing Museum, the British Sporting Art Trust and Retraining of Racehorses, and was opened by Elizabeth II in 2016.

National Horseracing Museum
The National Horseracing Museum of the United Kingdom, a registered charity, tells the history of horse racing. This is explored through works of art, silver, bronzes and artifacts including silks worn by famous jockeys such as Lester Piggott and Frankie Dettori. Using interactive and audio-visual displays, the museum also examines the physical attributes of elite equine athletes and the importance of thoroughbred pedigree.

It contains collections and records of people and horses involved in the sport of horse racing from its royal origins to the present day. Exhibits include the history of horse racing, horse racing in Britain, trophies, paintings of famous horses, trainers and jockeys, jockey uniforms, betting, and horse racing memorabilia. The Vestey Gallery of British Sporting Art is located in the museum, and features changing exhibits of art relating to sports, including hunting, shooting, fishing, boxing, archery, rowing, and horse racing.

The British Sporting Art Trust

The British Sporting Art Trust, a registered charity, hosts a large collection of important pieces of British sporting art at Palace House. In the remaining part of Charles II’s racing palace is the Fred Packard Museum and Galleries of British Sporting Art and a new home for the British Sporting Art Trust. Paintings by George Stubbs and Sir Alfred Munnings rub shoulders with works from John Singer Sargent and John Wootton, showcasing some of the finest examples of British Sporting Art.

The gallery explores the development of popular sporting images through paintings, sculpture, print-making and the applied arts. Significant loans have come from the Tate and the Victoria & Albert Museum, along with a number of private and public art collections.

Retraining of Racehorses

Retraining of Racehorses hosts a number of retired racehorses in the  Rothschild Yard in the Palace House grounds to meet with members of the public. There are daily tours for the public.

List of horses
The National Horseracing Museum contains an extensive archive of images from glass negatives with accompanying biographies. The list includes both runners and breeding stock.

See also
Australian Racing Hall of Fame
British Steeplechasing Hall of Fame
Canadian Horse Racing Hall of Fame
New Zealand Racing Hall of Fame 
United States National Museum of Racing and Hall of Fame

References

External links

The stallion Blandford at the National Horseracing Museum Hall of Fame Note: The image here is not a true representation of Blandford.
The mare Athasi at the National Horseracing Museum Hall of Fame

Horse racing in Great Britain
Horse racing museums and halls of fame
Equestrian museums in the United Kingdom
Sports museums in England
Art museums and galleries in Suffolk
Museums in Suffolk
Newmarket, Suffolk